Pierre Alvarez (7 August 1887 – 1 September 1964) was a French rower. He competed in the men's eight event at the 1912 Summer Olympics.

References

1887 births
1964 deaths
French male rowers
Olympic rowers of France
Rowers at the 1912 Summer Olympics
Sportspeople from Bayonne